Koregatani Dam is an earthfill dam located in Toyama prefecture in Japan. The dam is used for irrigation. The catchment area of the dam is 0.7 km2. The dam impounds about   ha of land when full and can store 260 thousand cubic meters of water. The construction of the dam was completed in 1968.

References

Dams in Toyama Prefecture
1968 establishments in Japan